The Indian Catholic Youth Movement (ICYM) is the largest Premier Catholic youth Movement in India. It is spread over 700 districts in India. The ICYM functions through 14 Regions & 132 Dioceses. It is an organisation for the Catholic youth from the Latin rite of the Christian community across India. The patron saint of Indian Catholic Youth Movement is St. Gonsalo Garcia.

References

General
 ICYM Mangaluru Diocese Central Council 2015 Newskarnataka.com, 6 July 2015
 ICYM III National Youth Conference

External links
 
 ICYM organizes bike rally for awareness on road safety (newskarnataka.com) 

Catholic youth organizations
Fimcap
Youth organisations based in India
Christian organisations based in India
Catholicism in India
Catholic Church in India
Youth organizations established in 1985
Christian organizations established in 1985
1985 establishments in Delhi